Giulio Mazzarini is a professional photographer and professor of photography living in London, England.

Early life and education
Giulio Mazzarini was born in Italy, and grew up in Rome, Italy, where he attended university. After graduating in Sociology, he deepened the studies of Visual Communication and Photography, thanks also to one of his lecturers, the former Benetton photographer and Creative Director Oliviero Toscani. After graduation, he moved to London, where he studied Design and Photography at the famous Central St Martins College.

Career
After helping the birth of the Trend Forecasting website WGSN, in 1999 he began his career as fashion and people photographer.
His photography has been seen in international magazines such as  Vanity Fair,  Marie Claire, Elle, Style, Label, Drome, Dazed & Confused, Psychologies,  Condé Nast Traveler, La Repubblica and has contributed to the image development of companies and brands, including L'Oréal, Reebok, Citroën, Gianfranco Ferre, Selfridges.
He is also Associate Professor of the University of the Arts London and Visiting Professor at the University of Milan IULM, Istituto Europeo di Design (IED) and at the Sapienza University of Rome.

External links
 Giulio Mazzarini's official website
 Profile in Showstudio
 Review in Fashionblog

Year of birth missing (living people)
Living people
Fashion photographers
Italian photographers
Italian emigrants to the United Kingdom